Knema tonkinensis is a species of plant in the family Myristicaceae. It is found in Laos and Vietnam.

References

tonkinensis
Vulnerable plants
Flora of Laos
Flora of Vietnam
Taxonomy articles created by Polbot